The Early Chapters is the first EP by Swedish melodic death metal band Soilwork. It was released by Listenable Records on January 20, 2004. It features two cover songs of the bands Deep Purple and Mercyful Fate, the original demo recording of "Shadow Child," the bonus track from their second album, plus a live song which was a bonus track from their first album, Burn and Disintegrated Skies are Japanese bonus tracks on their first album, Egypt was a bonus track on some versions of The Chainheart Machine.

Track listing

Credits
 Björn "Speed" Strid − Vocals
 Peter Wichers − Guitars
 Ola Frenning − Guitars
 Ola Flink − Bass guitar
 Sven Karlsson − Keyboards
 Henry Ranta − Drums

Soilwork albums
2004 EPs